or Dakshina is a Sanskrit word found in Buddhist, Hindu, Sikh and Jain literature where it may mean any donation, fees or honorarium given to a cause, monastery, temple, spiritual guide or after a ritual. It may be expected, or a tradition or voluntary form of dāna. The term is found in this context in the Vedic literature.

It may mean honorarium to a guru for education, training or guidance.

Etymology and description

According to Monier Williams, the term is found in many Vedic texts, in the context of "a fee or present to the officiating priest (consisting originally of a cow, Kātyāyana Śrautasūtra 15, Lāṭyāyana Śrautasūtra 8.1.2)",  a 'donation to the priest', a 'reward', an 'offering to a guru', a 'gift, donation'.

refers to the tradition of repaying one's teacher or guru after a period of study or the completion of formal education, or an acknowledgment to a spiritual guide. The tradition is one of acknowledgment, respect, and thanks. It is a form of reciprocity and exchange between student and teacher. The repayment is not exclusively monetary and may be a special task the teacher wants the student to accomplish.

Guru Dakshina (In Literature) 
Guru Dakshina (Play) in Hindi is written by Bihari Lal Harit in 1969.

In Indian epics 
There is a symbolic story in the Indian epic Mahabharata that discusses proper and improper , after a character named Ekalavya.. This story refers to a tribal boy's passion to learn and master archery.

The story, like many stories in Mahabharata, is an open ended parable on education, personal drive to learn, and what is proper and improper  In the epic Mahabharata, after the right hand thumb as  event, Drona is haunted and wonders if demanding Ekalavya's thumb was proper, Ekalavya goes on to re-master archery with four fingers of his right hand, as well as left hand, thereby becoming a mighty warrior, becomes accepted as a king, and tells his children that education is for everyone and that no one can close the doors of education on any human being.

See also
Guru-shishya tradition

References

Hindu traditions
Rigveda
Rigvedic deities